Saint Ursula is a 4th century Christian saint.

Saint Ursula, St. Ursula, St Ursula or St Ursula's may also refer to:

Other Catholic saints
 Ursula Ledóchowska (1865–1939), Polish nun

Catholic schools

Australia
 Saint Ursula's College, Armidale, New South Wales, amalgamated to form O'Connor Catholic College in 1975
 Saint Ursula's College, Kingsgrove, Sydney, New South Wales, Australia, a girls' school
 St Ursula's College, Toowoomba, Queensland, Australia, a private secondary girls' school
 St Ursula's College, Yeppoon, Queensland, Australia, a day and boarding high school

Indonesia
 St. Ursula Catholic School, Jakarta, Indonesia, a girls' school
 St. Ursula School Bumi Serpong Damai, South Tangerang, Indonesia, a private school

United Kingdom
 St Ursula's School, Westbury-on-Trym, Bristol, England, a private school
 St Ursula's Convent School, Greenwich, London, England, a girls' secondary school

United States
 St. Ursula Academy (Cincinnati, Ohio), United States, a girls' college preparatory school
 St. Ursula Academy (Toledo, Ohio), United States, a girls' college preparatory school

Other uses
 Mount St. Ursula, a peak in northern Slovenia
 Basilica of St. Ursula, Cologne, Germany
 St Ursula's Church, Berne, Switzerland, an Anglican Episcopal church
 St Ursula's, Chester, Cheshire, England, a designated Grade I listed building

See also
 Úrsula Micaela Morata, a beatified nun, reputed to have bilocated
 Santa Úrsula, a town and a municipality on the north coast of Tenerife
 Church of Sant'Orsola (Mantua), Italy